The canton of Couzeix is an administrative division of the Haute-Vienne department, western France. It was created at the French canton reorganisation which came into effect in March 2015. Its seat is in Couzeix.

It consists of the following communes:
 
Chaptelat
Couzeix
Nieul
Peyrilhac
Saint-Gence
Saint-Jouvent
Veyrac

References

Cantons of Haute-Vienne